Lynne McNamara (born 1944) is a Canadian journalist.

Education
After attending the University of British Columbia, Lynne taught elementary school for two years before leaving the profession for a career in television and radio.

Career
She started out at BCTV News as a script assistant, worked at CBLT as a script assistant and floor director, At CKVU's Vancouver Show as a talent co-ordinator and as a program co-ordinator at the Provincial Educational Media Centre. 

She has been a producer and replacement host at radio station CJOR, fashion reporter for the CBC Television show Midday, host of the local CBC Radio show ArtBeat, and co-host of the local CBC TV nostalgia series Then & Now. 

Lynne wrote the column "On Location" for The Province newspaper for nine years while she wrote, produced and introduced weekly behind-the-scenes movie set stories for BCTV's Early News. She also wrote, produced and voiced daily items on the local movie scene for News 1130 Radio for several years. 

Until recently, Lynne wrote a thrice-weekly column in The Vancouver Sun. She now maintains a blog, works as a film extra and is getting back into retail display design work.

References 

1944 births
Living people
Journalists from British Columbia
People from Duncan, British Columbia